A division is a type of administrative division of some Asian and African countries, as well as a sub-division of entities in England. Some have been dissolved or been renamed.

Administrative divisions

England
Some of the hundreds and wapentakes in England (of the historic counties of England) were divided into divisions. Also a number of the Wards of the City of London are, or were, divided into two divisions.

Types of administrative division